Robert Woodward (9 June 1653 – 13 February 1702) was an Anglican priest.

Woodward was born in Salford, Bedfordshire and educated at New College, Oxford. He graduated BCL in 1677; and DCL in 1686. He was ordained on 25 September 1681. He was Rector of Pewsey from 1685 until his death. Woodward served as Archdeacon of Wilts from 1681 until 1691; and Dean of Salisbury from then until his death.

References

1653 births
Alumni of New College, Oxford
17th-century English Anglican priests
18th-century English Anglican priests
Archdeacons of Wilts
Deans of Salisbury
1702 deaths
People from Bedfordshire